Maria Carmen Riu Pascual (born 11 April 1951 in Barcelona) is a retired Class 3 breaststroke and freestyle swimmer from Spain.  She competed at the 1968 Summer Paralympics, winning a pair of silver medals.

References 

Spanish female breaststroke swimmers
Spanish female freestyle swimmers
Living people
1951 births
Paralympic silver medalists for Spain
People from Barcelona
Swimmers at the 1968 Summer Paralympics
Paralympic medalists in swimming
Medalists at the 1968 Summer Paralympics
Paralympic swimmers of Spain
20th-century Spanish women